Willson House, also known as Tuckaway and Wee Dornoch, is a historic home located near Lexington, Rockbridge County, Virginia. It was built in 1812, and is a two-story, five-bay, Georgian / Federal style brick dwelling, with a one-story kitchen wing. It has a side gable roof, interior end chimneys, and a central-passage plan.  The front facade features a pedimented entry porch with brown sandstone front steps. Also on the property are a contributing smokehouse and garage.

It was listed on the National Register of Historic Places in 2009.

References

Houses on the National Register of Historic Places in Virginia
Georgian architecture in Virginia
Federal architecture in Virginia
Houses completed in 1812
Houses in Rockbridge County, Virginia
National Register of Historic Places in Rockbridge County, Virginia
1812 establishments in Virginia